Divine Insanity is Finnish band Lovex's first album, released in 2006. Album contains example song Guardian Angel.

Divine Insanity has sold gold in Finland and has got to lists in Germany, too. Special Edition of the album was released in Finland on 8 November 2006, and International Version was released in Germany on 16 January, in Finland on 21 January, and in Japan on 19 September 2007.

Track listing 

 "Bullet For The Pain" (Music & Lyrics by Lovex) - 3.31
 "Guardian Angel" (Music & Lyrics by Lovex & Janne) - 3.54
 "Oh How The Mighty Fall" (Music and Lyrics by Lovex) - 3.26
 "Remorse" (Music & Lyrics by Lovex) - 4.36
 "Bleeding" (Music by Lovex & Jussi, Lyrics by Lovex) - 3.46
 "Wounds" (Music and Lyrics by Lovex) - 3.54
 "Die A Little More" (Music by Lovex & Jussi, Lyrics by Lovex) - 3.25
 "On The Sidelines" (Music and Lyrics by Lovex) - 4.10
 "Halfway" (Music and Lyrics by Lovex) - 4.03
 "Divine Insanity" (Music and Lyrics by Lovex) - 3.59
 "Sleeptight" (Music and Lyrics by Lovex) - 1.49

Bonus songs of Special Edition 

 "Shout" (Music and Lyrics by Lovex) - 3.58
 "Heart of Stone (demo 2004)" (Music and Lyrics by Lovex) - 4.56
 "Guardian Angel (demo 2004)" (Music and Lyrics by Lovex & Janne) - 3.57
 "Yours" (Music by Lovex & Jussi S., Lyrics by Lovex) - 5.07
 "Runaway (live(cover, original version by Bon Jovi))" (Music and Lyrics by Bon Jovi & George Karakoglou) - 4.05
 "Die A Little More (live)" (Music by Lovex & Jussi, Lyrics by Lovex) - 3.28
 "Bullet For The Pain (live)" (Music and Lyrics by Lovex) - 3.42
 "Bullet For The Pain (video)" (Nelivetotuotanto / Director Jan-Niclas Jansson)
 "Guardian Angel (video)" (Nitro / Director Tuomas "Stobe" Harju)
Live-songs recorded at Espoo, Finland in 9.7.2006 by Marko Tetri and Henkka Wirsell.

International Version's bonus songs
 "Anyone, Anymore" (Music & Lyrics by Lovex) - 3.00
 "Shout" (Music & Lyrics by Lovex) - 3.58
 "Yours" (Music by Lovex & Jussi S., Lyrics by Lovex) - 5.07
International Version DOESN'T contain the songs On The Sidelines and Sleeptight.

Singles 
 Bleeding (10.8.2005)
 Guardian Angel (1.2.2006 in Finland, 5.1.2007 in Germany, Austria and Switzerland)
 Remorse (9.8.2006)
 Die A Little More (9.8.2006)
 Bullet For The Pain (PROMO 2006)
 Anyone, Anymore (16.2.2007 in Germany, Austria and Switzerland, 21.2.2007 in Finland)

Members 
 Theone - vocals
 Vivian Sin'amor - guitar
 Sammy Black - guitar
 Jason - bass
 Julian Drain - drums
 Christian - piano

Charts

References

2007 debut albums
Lovex albums
GUN Records albums